The National Center of Excellence (or National Center of Excellence - India Football Campus) by All India Football Federation is an under construction football complex, in Kolkata, West Bengal, India. It serves as the one of the home base for India national football team and India women's national football team. It includes India’s first ever roof top pitch. Built on a  land behind Eco Park and beside a proposed deer park, in Action Area II, Rajarhat, New Town.

Location 
The National Center of Excellence is located on Plot No. AA-IIE/57/A, Street Number 787, Action Area-II (E) of New Town. It is surrounded by Eco Park golf arena on two sides and proposed deer park on another side. Convention centre metro station of Kolkata Metro Line 6 will serve National Center of Excellence.

History 

Back in 2014, after the Kolkata-based club Atlético de Kolkata (ATK) won the first season of Indian Super League (ISL), Chief Minister Mamata Banerjee proposed and offered the club owners, plot in Rajarhat NewTown area, to build an international standard football stadium. She said, "We have the Salt Lake Stadium for football and the Eden Gardens for cricket. So, I would urge Atletico to develop an international stadium in Rajarhat where we are ready to provide you land" and "You have made entire Bengal proud by winning the ISL. I take this opportunity to urge you for developing the new stadium. Come to us with all the relevant documents and we will ensure the procedures are formalised as early as possible," During that time, the preparations for 2017 FIFA U-17 World Cup had also started. Government of West Bengal handed over Rabindra Sarobar Stadium to host U-17 World Cup matches and asked them to develop it into a world-class football stadium. In 2017, the quarter shareholder of ATK, Atlético Madrid exited and the plan of building an international standard football stadium never materialised. And the U-17 World Cup venue silently shifted from Rabindra Sarobar Stadium to Salt Lake Stadium. Later that year, during the U-17 World Cup, All India Football Federation President Praful Patel, with the presence of FIFA President Gianni Infantino and Mamata Banerjee announced National Centre of Excellence in Rajarhat, New Town. It was a part of U-17 World Cup legacy. A two-year deadline from inception of work was given. From beginning, the project has faced hurdles which led to delays. When work started, the region was hit by severe monsoon. Then in 2020, the Super Cyclone Amphan; COVID-19 pandemic and lockdown hampered the work.

Details 
The Center of Excellence is being set up by the All India Football Federation with the technical and financial help from FIFA and Asian Football Confederation. It will cater the India national football team and India women's national football team, and will be their home base. It will have technical centre for the national teams, coach and referee education, youth and grassroots development, hotel for the national teams, futsal development, medical centre, an artificial pitch, a natural pitch, a stadium, dressing rooms and centre for sports management, sports science and sports law. The centre will also feature India’s first ever roof top pitch. It is being built in multiple phases. The first phase includes the technical centre, artificial and natural fields. It is being designed by a Mumbai-based firm Collage Design Pvt. The centre will also feature India’s first ever roof top pitch.

See also 

 Football in Kolkata

References

External links 

 Official website of AIFF

Football in Kolkata
Football in India